Nazrul Centenary Polytechnic, established in 1997,  is a government polytechnic located in Hindustan Cables, Rupnarayanpur,  Paschim Bardhaman district, West Bengal.

About college
This Polytechnic is affiliated to the West Bengal State Council of Technical & Vocational Education & Skill Development, formerly known as West Bengal State Council of Technical Education,  and recognized by AICTE, New Delhi.

Departments
Nazrul Centenary Polytechnic offers three year diploma courses in the following three disciplines:
Diploma in Civil Engineering (30 seats)
Diploma in Mechanical Engineering (Production) (60 seats)
Diploma in Electronics and Instrumentation Engineering (30 seats)

See also

References

External links
 Admission to Polytechnics in West Bengal for Academic Session 2006-2007
Official website WBSCTE
Official website of Government Polytechnics under Department of Technical Education, Training and Skill Development

Universities and colleges in Paschim Bardhaman district
Educational institutions established in 1997
1997 establishments in West Bengal
Technical universities and colleges in West Bengal